During the Japanese invasions of Korea (1592–1598), the Japanese Left Army was a Japanese army. Under the command of Ukita Hideie in the late 16th century, it consisted mainly of the former First division led by Konishi Yukinaga, the Fourth Division led by Shimazu Yoshihiro, and the Eighth Division led by Ukita Hideie.

Organization
Konishi Yukinaga (小西行長) - 7,000 men
So Yoshitoshi (宗義智) - 1,000 men
Matsura Shigenobu (松浦鎮信) - 3,000 men
Arima Harunobu (有馬晴信) - 2,000 men
Omura Yoshiaki (大村喜前) - 1,000 men
Goto Sumiharu (五島純玄) - 700 men
Hachisuka Iemasa (蜂須賀家政) - 7,200 men
Mōri Yoshinari (毛利吉成) - 2,000 men
Ikoma Kazumasa (生駒一正) - 2,700 men
Shimazu Yoshihiro (島津義弘) - 10,000 men
Shimazu Tadatoyo (島津忠豊) - 800 men
Akizuki Tanenaga (秋月種長) - 300 men
Takahashi Mototane (高橋元種) - 600 men
Ito Suketaka (伊東祐兵) - 500 men
Sagara Yorifusa (相良頼房) - 800 men
Ukita Hideie (宇喜多秀家) - 10,000 men
Ota Kazuyoshi (太田一吉) -
Takenaka Shigetoshi (竹中重利) -

Battles Fought 

Battle of Chilcheollyang (Hangul : 칠천량)
The Siege of Namwon (Hangul : 남원성)
Battle of Geumgu (Hangul : 금구)
Battle of Myeongnyang (Hangul : 명량)
Battle of Gwangyang (Hangul : 광양)
Battle of Muju (Hangul : 무주성)
Battle of Hamyang (Hangul : 함양)
Battle of Sacheon (1598) (Hangul : 사천)
Siege of Suncheon (Hangul : 순천)
Battle of Noryang Point (Hangul : 노량)

See also 
Japanese Right Army
Japanese invasions of Korea (1592–1598)

Japanese invasions of Korea (1592–1598)